Deponent may refer to:
 A person who makes a deposition
 Deponent verb, a verb active in meaning, but passive or middle in form